Cacophis krefftii is a species of venomous snake in the family Elapidae. The species is endemic to Australia.

Etymology
The specific name, krefftii, is in honor of German-born Australian naturalist Gerard Krefft.

Common names
Common names for C. krefftii include dwarf crowned snake, southern dwarf crowned snake, and Krefft's dwarf snake.

Geographic range
The geographic range of C. krefftii extends from the  Central Coast of New South Wales to South East Queensland.

Reproduction
C. krefftii is oviparous.

References

Further reading
Boulenger GA (1896). Catalogue of the Snakes in the British Museum (Natural History). Volume III., Containing the Colubridæ (Opisthoglyphæ and Proteroglyphæ) ... London: Trustees of the British Museum (Natural History). (Taylor and Francis, printers). xiv + 727 pp. + Plates I-XXV. (Pseudelaps krefftii, p. 318).
Cogger HG (2014). Reptiles and Amphibians of Australia, Seventh Edition. Clayton, Victoria, Australia: CSIRO Publishing. xxx + 1,033 pp. .
Günther A (1863). "Third Account of new Species of Snakes in the Collection of the British Museum". Ann. Mag. Nat. Hist., Third Series 12: 348-365. (Cacophis krefftii, new species, p. 361).
Wilson, Steve; Swan, Gerry (2013). A Complete Guide to Reptiles of Australia, Fourth Edition. Sydney: New Holland Publishers. 522 pp. .

krefftii
Snakes of Australia
Taxa named by Albert Günther
Reptiles described in 1863